Bardaghat (or Bardghat) [नेपाली: बर्दघाट] is a Municipality in Parasi District in Lumbini Province, Nepal. It is situated in the lap of Chure range. This municipality was established on 18 May 2014 by merging existing Makar and Panchanagar VDCs. Again during the local election, the neighbouring VDC Dawanne devi and some part of Dhurkot, Jamuniya, Rupauliya were merged in it. It has a population of 55,382 (Last Census) with the area of 162.05 km2. It is an emerging town of Parasi District  that is developing rapidly.

.

Economy
It is a commercial and trading area, mostly an upcoming economy hub of Nawalparasi. The economy of Bardaghat is centred around trade, service and business. The main trading points are Bardaghat chowk, TCN chowk, Chisapani, etc. Besides the modern shopping, the traditional market called Hatbazar run twice around the city area in two places, Wednesday in Chisapani, Friday in Hatbazar line and Similarly Sunday in Dharma Basti. The main aspect of business in Bardaghat involves banking, education, transport and hotel. Dozens of banks, Financial institutes and co-operative societies operate from here.

Bardaghat is connected to the biggest city Butwal and Bharatpur through the Mahendra highway. It serves as the gateway for the province no 5. 
The private commerce and trade of Bardaghat are united under the umbrella of Bardaghat Chamber of Commerce and Industry. "Audhyogik Byapar Mela" is an industry exhibition held in Bardaghat yearly at Mangsir/Poush.

Transport
Bardaghat municipality is connected with Mahendra Highway that connects Bardaghat to the Kakarbhitta and Bhimdatta in east and west respectively. Another important highway of Bardaghat is hulaki highway that connects it to the Parasi and Bhairahawa. Bardaghat is also connected to Triveni through the Bardaghat-Triveni road also with the Maheshpur check post from the Bhutaha-Maheshpur road.
Several buses operate from Bardaghat for the further destination. Daily the number buses pass through the Bardaghat which can easily be accessed from the TCN chowk from which we can go to all part of Nepal. Nearly more than 100 bus departs from the bus terminal of Bardaghat to the short distance such as Bardaghat-Butwal, Bardaghat-Triveni, Bardaghat-Malbari, Bardaghat-Parasi, Bardaghat-Maheshpur. During the winter season, small jeeps also operate towards the hillside of the city.

Health
Health is a very important prospect required for humans. As such, Sahid Smriti Community Hospital and Chisapani Hospital are two major hospitals of this area. Private medical centres such as Sanjivani Health Home, Bardaghat Dental Clinic, Daunne Devi Hospital, etc. and other various Government health clinic are also present in Bardaghat.

Education
Bardaghat is set to be an educational hub for the western Nawalparasi with more than 50 private and government colleges. Divya Jyoti Multiple Campus and Daunnedevi Multiple campus are two notable colleges of Parasi area, providing education from kindergarten to master level. Other various schools and colleges of this area are:

Kindergarten 
 Kumudini English Boarding Secondary School
 Salbas Sunrise English Secondary School
 Oasis Model Academy
 Mount Everest English Boarding School
 DEBHIS 
 New Life English Boarding Higher Secondary School

 Ex-army English Boarding Higher Secondary School
 Glorious Academy 
 Iris Academy
 Daunne Devi Higher Secondary School
 Divya Jyoti Higher Secondary School
 Global Academy
 Holy Care English boarding School
 Manakamana English Boarding School
 Holy Angel English Boarding School
 Nawajiwan Higher Secondary School
 Shanti Nikunja Higher Secondary School
 Wisdom English Boarding School
 Raja Mahatma Purna Bhadra Secondary School
 Shree Adarsha H.S school 
 Gyan Jyoti School
 Bardaghat Enlightened English School
 Shree Saraswati Secondary School, Kunjanpur
 Shree Nityanand Ratna Kumaru Secondary School, Jahada
 Gyankunj Shiksha Sadan
 Universal Cambridge English Boarding School
 SUMIN ADHIKARI ACADEMY

Colleges
 Daunne Devi Multiple Campus
 Divya Jyoti Multiple Campus
 Shree Daunne Devi Technical College
 New Life College
 Kumudini College
 Ex-army College

Sports
Bardaghat is a hometown of a well-known football player Bimal Gharti Magar and cricket player Rohit Paudel. Sports such as football, cricket, martial art, badminton, volleyball, basketball, etc. are being played in Bardaghat. Ex-Army Camp is one of the famous and multi-purpose grounds located here. In Bardaghat, a covered hall is in under construction.

Place of interest 
 Daunne temple
 Triveni
 Buddhamangal Taal
 Ramgram
 Kanchankuti
 Sansarkot
 Kanchangadhi
lumbini]
chisapani tall 
hawa tall

Media
The two radio channels in operation are Radio Daunne and Dautari FM. One weekly daily named as "Esthaniya Patra" and a local television channel "Triveni Television" are two popular media in this area.

References

Populated places in Parasi District
Municipalities in Lumbini Province
Nepal municipalities established in 2014